

Overview 
Spongilla is a genus of freshwater sponges with over 200 different species. Spongilla was first publicly recognized in 1696 by Leonard Plukenet and can be found in lakes, ponds and slow streams.Spongilla have a leuconoid body form with a skeleton composed of siliceous spicules. They are sessile organisms, attaching themselves to hard substrate like rocks, logs and sometimes to ground. Using their ostia and osculum these sponges filter the water for various small aquatic organisms such as protozoans, bacteria, and other free-floating pond life. Sponges of the genus Spongilla partake in symbiotic relationships with green algae, zoochlorellae. The symbiotic zoochlorellae give the sponges a green appearance and without them they would appear white.

Spongilla was used by John Hogg in the 19th century to attempt to justify a fourth kingdom of life.

Reproduction 
Sponges are hermaphroditic organisms, producing both egg and sperm. Sperm is released from one sponge and brought in through the ostia of another sponge. Once the sperm reaches the body cavity it is fertilized and develops into a free-swimming larvae. The free-swimming larvae is released out the osculum and will eventually settle and attach elsewhere. Since the larvae are developed inside the spongilla it is viviparous.

Unlike marine sponges, freshwater sponges are exposed to far more variable environmental conditions, so they have developed gemmules as an overwintering mechanism. When exposed to excessively cold or other harsh conditions, the sponges form gemmules. Gemmules are highly resistant buds that can live dormant for extended periods of time. When conditions improve, the gemmules "germinate" and a new sponge is born.

Species
 Spongilla alba Carter, 1849
 Spongilla arctica Annandale, 1915
 Spongilla cenota Penney & Racek, 1968
 Spongilla chaohuensis Cheng, 1991
 Spongilla gutenbergiana Müller, Zahn & Maidhof, 1982
 Spongilla helvetica Annandale, 1909
 Spongilla jiujiangensis Cheng, 1991
 Spongilla lacustris Linnaeus, 1758
 Spongilla mucronata Topsent, 1932
 Spongilla permixta Weltner, 1895
 Spongilla prespensis Hadzische, 1953
 Spongilla sarasinorum Weltner, 1901
 Spongilla shikaribensis Sasaki, 1934
 Spongilla stankovici Arndt, 1938
 Spongilla wagneri Potts, 1889

References
Footnotes

Bibliography
 Myers, P., R. Espinosa, C. S. Parr, T. Jones, G. S. Hammond, and T. A. Dewey. 2006. The Animal Diversity Web (online). Accessed February 19, 2007 at http://animaldiversity.org.

External links

 
 Integrated Taxonomica Information System (ITIS): Spongilla  Lamarck, 1816 Taxonomic Serial No.: 47692 
 National Center for Biotechnology Information (NCBI): Spongilla Taxonomy ID: 6054

Sponge genera
Spongillidae
Taxa named by Jean-Baptiste Lamarck